Jiří Reynek (5 July 1929 – 15 October 2014) was a Czech poet and graphic artist. Fluent in French, he translated the works of Henri Pourrat and Francis Jammes. He was the son of Suzanne Renaud and Bohuslav Reynek. Photographer Daniel Reynek was his older brother. The family spent winters in Grenoble and summers in Petrkov, where Reynek spent most of his adult life. The family farm was seized by Germany during World War II, then came under state control after Czechoslovakia transitioned to communism in the 1948 coup d'état.

Reynek was born in Paris, France and died on 15 October 2014, aged 85 in Petrkov, Czech Republic.

Works

References

External links

Google Books listing

2014 deaths
1929 births
Czech translators
Czech poets
Czech male poets
Czech graphic designers
20th-century Czech poets
20th-century translators
20th-century male writers